Frederick Lash (7 April 1870 – 10 November 1966) was a New Zealand cricketer. He played in two first-class matches for Wellington from 1893 to 1897.

See also
 List of Wellington representative cricketers

References

External links
 

1870 births
1966 deaths
New Zealand cricketers
Wellington cricketers
Cricketers from Greymouth